Lee Ho (born 22 October 1984) is a South Korean football coach and a former player. He is an assistant manager with Seoul E-Land FC.

Career 
He signed for Zenit Saint Petersburg on 30 June 2006, two days after Kim Dong-Jin, following their coach Dick Advocaat.

Al Ain FC
Prior to the January transfer window opening Al Ain were in search for an Asian foreign player to play alongside non-Asians Jorge Valdivia, Emerson and Jose Sand. Rumours began to flow that Lee was the Emirati club's main transfer target.

On 18 January, Lee was presented to the press with the number 50 and officially announced as the fourth foreign player in Al Ain's squad with a contract until the end of the season with an option to renew for another year.

Ulsan Hyundai
For the 2021, Lee Ho returned to Ulsan Hyundai as a playing coach and retired at the end of 2022 season.

Managerial career 
Lee Ho joined Seoul E-Land FC as an assistant coach.

International 
He played in all three of South Korea's games at the 2006 World Cup in Germany.

Personal life
In 2009, Lee Ho married Yang Eun-ji, who was a member of Baby Vox Re.V and is a sister of actress Yang Mi-ra. Lee Ho and Yang Eun-ji have three daughters.

Club career statistics 
Last update: 26 April 2017

Honours
Ulsan Hyundai
K League 1 (1): 2005
K-League Cup (1): 2011
Korean Super Cup (1): 2006
AFC Champions League (1): 2012
A3 Champions Cup (1): 2006

Zenit Saint Petersburg
UEFA Cup (1): 2007–08

Jeonbuk Hyundai Motors
AFC Champions League (1): 2016

Muangthong United
Thai League Cup (1): 2017
Mekong Club Championship (1): 2017

References

External links
 
 
 National Team Player Record 
 
 
 
 

1984 births
Living people
Association football midfielders
South Korean footballers
South Korean expatriate footballers
South Korea international footballers
Gimcheon Sangmu FC players
FC Zenit Saint Petersburg players
UEFA Cup winning players
Seongnam FC players
Al Ain FC players
Omiya Ardija players
Ulsan Hyundai FC players
Jeonbuk Hyundai Motors players
K League 1 players
Russian Premier League players
J1 League players
Expatriate footballers in Russia
Expatriate footballers in the United Arab Emirates
Expatriate footballers in Japan
2006 FIFA World Cup players
2007 AFC Asian Cup players
Footballers from Seoul
South Korean expatriate sportspeople in Russia
South Korean expatriate sportspeople in the United Arab Emirates
South Korean expatriate sportspeople in Japan
Footballers at the 2006 Asian Games
Lee Ho
UAE Pro League players
Asian Games competitors for South Korea